The 1964 European Nations' Cup qualifying tournament was a football competition that was played from June 1962 to April 1964 to determine the four UEFA member men's national teams which would participate in the 1964 European Nations' Cup final tournament.

Qualified teams

{| class="wikitable sortable"
|-
! Team
! Qualified as
! Qualified on
! data-sort-type="number"|Previous appearances in tournament
|-
|  ||  ||  || 0 (debut)
|-
|  (host) ||  ||  || 0 (debut)
|-
|  ||  ||  || 0 (debut)
|-
|  ||  ||  || 1 (1960)
|}

Format
The qualification was a knockout tournament where the teams would play a two-legged tie on a home-and-away basis. If the aggregate scores were level at the end of the tie, a third leg was played at a neutral venue to decide the winners. It consisted of a preliminary round, a round of 16, and a quarter-final round. The four quarter-final winners would qualify for the tournament proper; one of those four countries would then be chosen to host it.

Preliminary round

Austria, Luxembourg, and the Soviet Union received byes to the round of 16.

Round of 16

Quarter-finals

Goalscorers

Notes

References

External links
 1964 European Nations' Cup at UEFA.com

 
Qualifying
UEFA European Championship qualifying
European Nations
European Nations